Slavko Ćulibrk (Serbian Cyrillic: Славко Ћулибрк; born 21 March 1984) is a professional football player who plays for Drina Zvornik.

Career
A guy from Kikinda, son of football coach, began his career in his hometown club OFK Kikinda. In addition, he played on loan at the Sloboda Novi Kozarci, Senta and a half year in the Mladost Lukićevo.

After that, he played for Banat Zrenjanin in the Serbian First League, and two years later moved to the SuperLiga club Sloboda Užice.

In Užice he played for one year, not always the first choice for coach Ljubiša Stamenković. In January 2013, he went to Rabotnički in Skopje.

In summer of 2013, he returned to Serbia, signed Voždovac.

References

External links
 Slavko Ćulibrk at fkvozdovac.rs
 Slavko Ćulibrk at jelenfootball.com
 
 Slavko Ćulibrk at soccerfame.com
 Slavko Ćulibrk at eurorivals.net
 

1986 births
Living people
Sportspeople from Kikinda
Association football defenders
Serbian footballers
OFK Kikinda players
FK Senta players
FK Banat Zrenjanin players
FK Sloboda Užice players
FK Voždovac players
FK Zemun players
Serbian SuperLiga players
FK Rabotnički players
FK Drina Zvornik players